I Am > I Was (pronounced "I am greater than I was") is the second studio album by rapper 21 Savage, released on December 21, 2018. I Am > I Was features vocals by J. Cole, City Girls, Offset, Post Malone, Gunna, Lil Baby, Schoolboy Q, Project Pat, Childish Gambino, and Savage's cousin Young Nudy. The deluxe edition was released three days later, featuring one more song, which features an additional guest appearance from Travis Scott.

I Am > I Was was supported by two singles, "A Lot" and "Monster". The album received widespread acclaim from critics and performed well commercially, debuting atop the US Billboard 200 with 131,000 album-equivalent units, of which 18,000 were pure sales. It was nominated for Best Rap Album at the 2020 Grammy Awards.

Background
21 Savage tweeted "12-7-18" in November, which led to speculation that the album would be released on that date. The tracklist was leaked by record producer Louis Bell via his Instagram story on December 13, 2018. 21 Savage later stated in his Instagram story that he was "sorry" because he "forgot" to release the album, but a later video stated it would be released on December 21.

Cover art
21 Savage posted the cover art on Instagram on December 6, which features a blurred out image of himself, captioning the image with a number of goat emojis. Billboard called the cover art "cryptic".

Singles
The album's lead single, "A Lot", was released to rhythmic and urban contemporary radio on January 8, 2019. The album's second single, "Monster", was sent to rhythmic contemporary radio on May 7, 2019.

Critical reception

I Am > I Was was met with widespread critical acclaim. At Metacritic, which assigns a normalized rating out of 100 to reviews from professional publications, the album received an average score of 81, based on six reviews. Aggregator AnyDecentMusic? gave it 7.2 out of 10, based on their assessment of the critical consensus.

Reviewing the album for Variety, A. D. Amorosi stated: "Despite all the high-profile guests, it's actually on the soulfully inventive "Ball w/o You", "Gun Smoke" and the sensual "Out for the Night"—which all feature 21 Savage on his own—that "i am > i was" is at its best and most dynamic." Eric Diep of HipHopDX said, "At 15 songs and 51 minutes long, it's an enjoyable listen with good pacing, filled with the right amount of vulnerability, heartache, menace, and savagery". Ben Beaumont-Thomas of The Guardian saying "There is a slight uptick in vocal musicality compared with his previous work. ... He has plenty of average lines—almost as offensive as the rightly controversial "Jewish money" lyric in ASMR is the weakness of "you get burned like toast" as a simile—but his catchy flows always make him magnetic, especially when paired with universally brilliant production from Metro Boomin, Kid Hazel and others".

Paul A. Thompson from Pitchfork stated, "i am > i was shatters the notion of 21 Savage as a specialist with a narrow purview and audience, and recasts him as a star in waiting, all without forcing him into unflattering contortions. It also cements him as a far more original stylist than other hopefuls from Atlanta". Consequence critic Michael Pementel said, "21 Savage's ability to express a variety of feelings allows the music to stand out at times and become more than a generic gangsta rap presentation. It's unfortunate, then, that the record finds itself held back by unfeeling and monotonous takes on issues like gun violence. Overall, i am > i was is a mixed bag of experience that offers enough solid tracks to keep fans latched on".

Year-end lists

Industry awards

Commercial performance
I Am > I Was debuted at number one on the US Billboard 200 in the first chart issue of 2019, earning 131,000 album-equivalent units (including 18,000 pure album sales) in its first week, becoming 21 Savage's first US number-one album. In its second week, the album remained at number one, earning 65,000 units, down 51 percent from its debut week. In its third week, the album fell down to number two with 56,000 units (down 14 percent). A Boogie wit da Hoodie's Hoodie SZN surpassed him with 58,000 equivalent album units in the United States in the week ending January 10, 2019. On January 8, 2020, the album was certified platinum by the Recording Industry Association of America (RIAA) for combined sales and album-equivalent units of over a million units in the United States.

Following the release of I Am > I Was, nine songs debuted on the US Billboard Hot 100. It was led by "A Lot", which peaked at number 12 in its seventh week.

Track listing

Notes
  signifies a co-producer 
  signifies an uncredited co-producer
 "A Lot" features vocals by J. Cole 
 "A&T" features vocals by City Girls
 "1.5" features vocals by Offset
 "All My Friends" features vocals by Post Malone
 "Can't Leave Without It" features vocals by Gunna and Lil Baby
 "Good Day" features vocals by Schoolboy Q and Project Pat
 "Monster" features vocals by Childish Gambino, Braylen Green, Mario Ricks, Jr., Hattori Williams, and Peyton Eleazor
 "4L" features vocals by Young Nudy
 "Out for the Night, Pt. 2" features vocals by Travis Scott

Sample credits
 "A Lot" contains a sample from "I Love You for All Seasons", written by Shelia Young, and performed by The Fuzz.
 "A&T" contains a sample from "Azz & Tittiez", written by Paul Beauregard, Jordan Houston, Brandt Jones, Danell Stevens, Earl Stevens, Tenina Stevens, Marvin Whitemon and Delmar Lawrence, and performed by Hypnotize Camp Posse.
 "Out for the Night" and "Out for the Night, Pt. 2" contain a sample from "Samba Pa Ti", written and performed by Carlos Santana.
 "Good Day" contains a sample from "Damn I'm Crazed", written by Paul Beauregard, and performed by DJ Paul and Lord Infamous.

Personnel
Credits were adapted from Tidal.

Instrumentation
 Einer Bankz – guitar (tracks 4, 16)
 Darnell Stoxstell – bass (track 14)

Technical
 Mac Attkisson – recording (tracks 1–9, 11–16), mixing (tracks 10, 12, 15)
 Deyvid Ford – recording (track 10)
 Riley Mackin – recording (track 13)
 Young Nudy – recording (track 15)
 Maddox "MaddMix" Chhim – mixing (tracks 1, 3–6, 8, 11, 13, 14, 16)
 Ethan Stevens – mixing (tracks 2, 9)
 Louis Bell – mixing (track 7), recording (track 7)
 Colin Leonard – mastering (all tracks)

Charts

Weekly charts

Year-end charts

Decade-end charts

Certifications

Release history

References

2018 albums
21 Savage albums
Albums produced by Boi-1da
Albums produced by Cardo
Albums produced by Cubeatz
Albums produced by DJ Dahi
Albums produced by FKi (production team)
Albums produced by J. White Did It
Albums produced by Louis Bell
Albums produced by Metro Boomin
Albums produced by Southside (record producer)
Albums produced by TM88